Barking Riverside is a railway station in the London Borough of Barking and Dagenham, East London. The station serves the Barking Riverside regeneration area, and was built as part of a £327m extension of the Gospel Oak to Barking Line to the area. It opened on 18 July 2022. It is served by London Overground, and provides interchange with the Thames Clippers boat service from Barking Riverside Pier.

The extension reduces typical journey times to the centre of Barking from the area by 18 minutes.

History 
The site has planning permission for around 10,800 homes, however planning restrictions prevent more than 1,200 homes without adequate transport links. 

An extension of the Docklands Light Railway to Dagenham Dock was proposed in the mid 2000s at a cost of around £750m, however this extension was cancelled in 2008 by then Mayor of London Boris Johnson. Following this, Transport for London assessed various options to bring transport links to Barking Riverside, including the previously proposed DLR extension, extension of the Hammersmith & City line to Grays, new segregated, high frequency bus services and a new station at Renwick Road. 

Following a decision to extend the Gospel Oak to Barking line to the area in 2014, the proposed route was consulted on in 2014, 2015 and 2016. Following this, a Transport and Works Act Order for the extension and new station was submitted in March 2016. As part of this process, a public inquiry was held in October 2016. The Transport and Works Order was approved in August 2017.

Construction 
Following approval of the Transport and Works Order in August 2017, construction on the extension by a joint venture of Morgan Sindall and VolkerFitzpatrick began in late 2018. Construction was originally expected to take 3 years at a cost of £260m, with the new station opening in December 2021. The station building has been designed by Weston Williamson. Following delays caused by COVID-19 pandemic restrictions and utility diversion issues, it was announced in December 2020 that the extension would be delayed until Autumn 2022, with a cost increase to £327m.

Opening 
In June 2022, TfL announced that the extension's opening would be brought forward to open in summer 2022. This was followed by an announcement on 11 July 2022 that services would begin on 18 July 2022. The opening coincided with the 2022 United Kingdom heat wave with temperatures of nearly 40°C. TfL issued a warning to passengers advising them to only travel if essential. As a result, the first day of operation saw few passengers.

Future 
As part of the future development of the area, the Barking Riverside town centre will be built adjacent to the station, with public space, shops, community facilities and a bus interchange.

Route 
It then branches from the existing line, passing underneath Renwick Road where a future station at Renwick Road has been passively safeguarded. The extension then turns south, crossing the main line and the Ripple Lane freight yard on a viaduct, as well as crossing over the High Speed 1 tunnels.

There have also been calls to extend the line further south across the river to Thamesmead and Abbey Wood. A future extension across the Thames is not prevented by this project, however an extension of the Docklands Light Railway to Thamesmead has been proposed instead.

The station is owned by Transport for London, however the railway infrastructure was handed over to Network Rail upon project completion.

Services
The typical off-peak service is four trains per hour to  via the Gospel Oak to Barking Line. Later in the evening, the service is reduced to three trains per hour.

All services are operated by London Overground using  EMUs.

Connections
Thames Clippers services from Barking Riverside Pier is a short walk away from the station. East London Transit branded bus routes also serve the station.

References

External links 

 Official project page: 

station
Railway stations served by London Overground
Transport in the London Borough of Barking and Dagenham
Railway stations in the London Borough of Barking and Dagenham
Railway stations in Great Britain opened in 2022
Railway stations opened by Network Rail